Great Britain, represented by the British Olympic Association (BOA), competed at the 1952 Summer Olympics in Helsinki, Finland. 257 competitors, 213 men and 44 women, took part in 127 events in 18 sports. In 1952, they achieved their only gold medal during the last event of the last day of competition in Helsinki. Along with 1904 and 1996, this is Great Britain's lowest gold medal count.

Medallists

Gold
 Harry Llewellyn, Duggie Stewart, and Wilf White — Equestrian, Jumping Team Competition

Silver
 Sheila Lerwill — Athletics, Women's High Jump
 Charles Currey — Sailing, Men's Finn Individual Competition

Bronze
 McDonald Bailey — Athletics, Men's 100 metres
 John Disley — Athletics, Men's 3000m Steeplechase
 Heather Armitage, Sylvia Cheeseman, Jean Desforges, and June Foulds-Paul — Athletics, Women's 4 × 100 metres Relay
 Shirley Cawley — Athletics, Women's long jump
 Donald Burgess, George Newberry, Alan Newton, and Ronald Stretton — Cycling, Men's 4000m Team Pursuit
 Helen Gordon — Swimming, Women's 200m Breaststroke
 Kenneth Richmond — Wrestling, Men's Freestyle Heavyweight
 Denys Carnill, John Cockett, John Conroy, Graham Dadds, Derek Day, Dennis Eagan, Robin Fletcher, Roger Midgley, Richard Norris, Neil Nugent, Anthony Nunn, Anthony Robinson, and John Taylor — Field Hockey, Men's Team Competition

Athletics

Men's 100 metres
 McDonald Bailey
 First Round — 10.4s
 First Round — 10.5s
 Semifinals — 10.5s
 Final — 10.4s (→  Bronze Medal)

Men's Hammer Throw
Duncan Clark
 Qualifying Round — 50.69m
 Final Round — 51.07m (→ 18th place)

Women's discus throw
 Suzanne Allday
 Qualifying Round — 36.37 m
 Final — 37.96 m (→ 15th place)

Boxing

Men's Flyweight:
 David Dower
 First Round – Defeated Abdelamid Boutefnouchet of France (3–0)
 Second Round – Defeated Leslie Donovan Perera Handunge of Ceylon (3–0)
 Third Round – Lost to Anatoli Bulakov of Soviet Union (1–2)

Men's Bantamweight:
 Thomas Nicholls
 First Round – Lost to Pentti Olavi Hämäläinen of Finland (0–3)

Men's Featherweight:
 Percival Lewis
 First Round – Lost to Georghe Ilie of Romania (0–3)

Men's Lightweight:
 Frederick Reardon
 First Round – Defeated Roger Cuche of Switzerland (KO 3R)
 Second Round – Defeated Aleksandr Zasuhin of Soviet Union (0–3)
 Third Round – Lost to Aleksy Antkiewicz of Poland (0–3)

Men's Light Welterweight: 
 Peter Waterman
 First Round – Defeated Oscar Juan Galardo of Argentina (2–1)
 Second Round – Lost to Alexander Grant Webster of South Africa (0–3)

Men's Welterweight:
 John Maloney
 First Round – Lost to Július Torma of Czechoslovakia (1–2)

Men's Light Middleweight: 
 Bernard Foster
 First Round – Lost to Petar Stankoff Spassoff of Bulgaria (1–2)

Men's Middleweight:
 Terence Gooding
 First Round – Defeated Moustafa Mohamed Fahim of Egypt (2–1)
 Second Round – Lost to Boris Georgiev Nikolov of Bulgaria (2–1)

Men's Light Heavyweight:
 Henry Cooper
 Second Round – Lost to Anatoli Perov of Soviet Union (1–2)

Men's Heavyweight:
 Edgar Hearn
 First Round – Defeated José Victorio Sartor of Argentina (2–1)
 Third Round – Lost to Ilkka Rickhard Koski of Finland (0–3)

Canoeing

Cycling

Road Competition
Men's Individual Road Race (190.4 km)
Desmond Robinson — 5:18:08.9 (→ 26th place)
Brian Robinson — 5:18:08.9 (→ 27th place)
Graham Vines — 5:22:33.2 (→ 31st place)
Leslie Ingman — did not finish (→ no ranking)

Track Competition
Men's 1.000m Time Trial
Donald McKellow
 Final — 1:13.3 (→ 5th place)

Men's 1.000m Sprint Scratch Race
Cyril Peacock — 4th place

Men's 4.000m Team Pursuit
Alan Newton, Donald Burgess, George Newberry, and Ronald Stretton
 Bronze Medal Match — defeated France (→  Bronze Medal)

Diving

Men's 3m Springboard
Anthony Turner
 Final — 151.90 points (→ 7th place)

Peter Heatly
 Preliminary Round — 63.37 points (→ 16th place)

Peter Elliott
 Preliminary Round — 61.85 points (→ 20th place)

Women's 10m Platform
Phyllis Long
 Preliminary Round — 43.23 points
 Final — 63.19 points (→ 5th place)

Diana Spencer
 Preliminary Round — 43.16 points
 Final — 60.76 points (→ 7th place)

Valerie Lloyd-Chandos
 Preliminary Round — 35.39 points (→ 12th place)

Equestrian

Fencing

17 fencers, 14 men and 3 women, represented Great Britain in 1952.

Men's foil
 René Paul
 Luke Wendon
 Raymond Paul

Men's team foil
 René Paul, Luke Wendon, Emrys Lloyd, Raymond Paul, Harry Cooke, Allan Jay

Men's épée
 Allan Jay
 Ronald Parfitt
 René Paul

Men's team épée
 René Paul, Allan Jay, Christopher Grose-Hodge, Ronald Parfitt, Raymond Harrison, Charles de Beaumont

Men's sabre
 William Beatley
 Bob Anderson
 Olgierd Porebski

Men's team sabre
 Roger Tredgold, Olgierd Porebski, Bob Anderson, William Beatley, Luke Wendon

Women's foil
 Mary Glen-Haig
 Gillian Sheen
 Patricia Buller

Football

Gymnastics

The British Gymnastics team competed in 15 events and was made up of 14 gymnasts, (6 men and 8 women),  
including Frank Turner and George Weedon, both of whom had competed in the 1948 Summer Olympics.

Hockey

Modern pentathlon

Three male pentathletes represented Great Britain in 1952.

Individual
 Leon Lumsdaine
 John Hewitt
 Jervis Percy

Team
 Leon Lumsdaine
 John Hewitt
 Jervis Percy

Rowing

Great Britain had 23 male rowers participate in six out of seven rowing events in 1952.

 Men's single sculls – Fourth
 Tony Fox

 Men's double sculls
 John MacMillan (born 1932)
 Peter Brandt

 Men's coxless pair – Fourth
 David Callender
 Christopher Davidge

 Men's coxless four – Fourth
 Harry Almond
 John Jones
 James Crowden
 Adrian Cadbury

 Men's coxed four – Fourth
 John MacMillan (born 1928)
 Graham Fisk
 Laurence Guest
 Peter de Giles
 Paul Massey (cox)

 Men's eight – Fourth
 David Macklin
 Alastair MacLeod
 Nicholas Clack
 Roger Sharpley
 Edward Worlidge
 Brian Lloyd
 William Windham
 David Jennens
 John Hinde (cox)

Sailing

Shooting

Twelve shooters represented Great Britain in 1952.

25 m pistol
 Henry Steele
 Henry Swire

50 m pistol
 Ronald Guy
 William White

300 m rifle, three positions
 John Pearson
 Jocelyn Barlow

50 m rifle, three positions
 Steffen Cranmer
 Charles Hyde

50 m rifle, prone
 Charles Hyde
 Steffen Cranmer

100m running deer
 Cyril Mackworth-Praed
 Ingram Capper

Trap
 Enoch Jenkins
 Charles Lucas

Swimming

Water polo

Weightlifting

Wrestling

References

Nations at the 1952 Summer Olympics
1952
Summer Olympics